Ivan Klisanin (born January 25, 1975) is an American, Grammy Award-winning record producer from Lafayette, Louisiana, United States.

Awards
2016 Grammy nomination for Best Regional Roots Music Album for The Revelers - Get Ready. 
2013 Grammy nomination for Best Regional Roots Music Album for Corey Ledet With Anthony Dopsie, Dwayne Dopsie and Andre Thierry - Nothin' But the Best.
2010 Grammy Winner for Best Zydeco or Cajun Music Album for Chubby Carrier and the Bayou Swamp Band - Zydeco Junkie.
2010 Grammy nomination for Best Zydeco or Cajun Album for Feufollet - En Couleurs.

Selected discography 
The Bluerunners - Honey Slides
The Mercy Brothers - Holy Ghost Power 
Feufollet - Cow Island Hop, En Couleurs
Horace Trahan - Keep Walking
Odd Arnie - Stating the Oddvious

References

External links
IMDb.com entry
Discogs.com entry

1975 births
Living people
Record producers from Louisiana
People from Lafayette, Louisiana